James Anthony Mulvihill (27 April 1919 – 10 December 2000) was an Australian politician. Born in Sydney, he was educated at Catholic schools before becoming a railways employee. He was an official with the Australian Railways Union and then served as Assistant Secretary of the New South Wales Labor Party from 1957 to 1965. In 1964, he was elected to the Australian Senate as a Labor Senator for New South Wales. He remained in the Senate until his retirement in 1983.

Mulvihill died in 2000, aged 81.

References

Australian Labor Party members of the Parliament of Australia
Members of the Australian Senate for New South Wales
Members of the Australian Senate
1919 births
2000 deaths
20th-century Australian politicians